The Maine Cats is a United States Australian Football League team, based in Portland, Maine, United States. It was founded in 2018.

2018 season

2019 season

See also
Facebook
Instagram

References

Australian rules football clubs in the United States
Sports in Portland, Maine
Sports teams in Maine
2018 establishments in Maine
Australian rules football clubs established in 2018